Social Democratic Union of Workers and Smallholders (TPSL) was a political party in Finland. TPSL originated as a fraction of the Social Democratic Party of Finland, headed by Emil Skog and Aarre Simonen. Skog was the former chairman of SDP and was in dispute with the incumbent chairman, Väinö Leskinen. The party was founded in 1959, had seats in the parliament in 1959–1970 and was dissolved in 1973. It was generally identified as being politically between SDP and SKDL (a Communist-dominated organization).

History
The fraction split from SDP in 1959 after few years of infighting, and retained SDP's party platform until 1967, opining that SDP didn't follow its own platform. The main cause for the rift was that SDP's party leadership, particularly Väinö Tanner and Väinö Leskinen wanted to develop the party towards a "general party" appealing to the entire public. TPSL in contrast, as the name suggests, wanted SDP to be a special interest party for the workers and small farmers. Leskinen wanted to co-operate with the right wing, based SDP politics on the general population, and his economic policy was conservative and deflatory, and he criticised agricultural subsidies. In contrast, Skog's fraction wanted to co-operate with the agrarians and other leftists in popular front governments (kansanrintamahallitus), and base their politics exclusively on the trade unions. For example, Heikki Laavola has written that the disagreement was not over left vs. right ideology; all of Tanner, Leskinen, Skog and Simonen had been formerly active in anti-Communist pursuits. Disagreements between and about individuals played a role; Tanner had actually been convicted (under Soviet pressure) for being responsible to the Continuation War, and as such, he being the leader of SDP was a problem to the Soviets.

The rift was accompanied by a division in associated societies and the trade unions. The main trade union, Central Organisation of Finnish Trade Unions, was controlled mostly by Skog's men, as was the youth league, sports federation and women's league. The first example was that SDP's leadership wanted the worker's sports federation to associate with the right-wing sports federation in order to qualify for entry to Olympics, which Skog's fraction disputed as bourgeoise.

TPSL had 13-15 representatives of 200 in the parliament after the split in 1959, gained only two in 1962 elections, got seven representatives in 1966 and permanently dropped out of the parliament in 1970. Significantly, TPSL co-operated with the especially powerful President Urho Kekkonen, and was a partner in coalition cabinets (Karjalainen I, Paasio I, Koivisto I). In 1963, SDP changed its policy such that good relations with Kekkonen and Soviet Union were a new priority, thus removing a significant cause for disagreement. Skog himself returned to SDP in 1965. TPSL radicalized and became more Soviet-friendly, but lost its popular support, and was dissolved in 1973. The decision was made in December 1972 as TPSL board voted 10–3 for the return to the SDP. A minority faction, including Simonen and some other former MPs, formed the Socialist Workers Party.

Members of Parliament
in 1958–1959 Parliamentary Group of Social Democratic Opposition

 Laura Brander-Wallin 1962
 Vappu Heinonen SDP→1958–1962, 1966–1970
 Mikko Hult SDP→1958–1962
 Armas Härkönen 1958–1962
 Urho Kulovaara SDP→1958–1962
 Tyyne Leivo-Larsson 1966–1970
 Valdemar Liljeström SDP→1958–1960
 Impi Lukkarinen SDP→1958–1970
 Aino Malkamäki 1960–1961
 Viljo Pousi 1966–1970
 Eeno Pusa 1961–1962
 Olavi Saarinen 1966–1970
 Martta Salmela-Järvinen SDP→1958–1966
 Aili Siiskonen 1958–1962, 1966–1970
 Aarre Simonen SDP→1958–1962
 Arvo Sävelä SDP→1958–1962
 Arvi Turkka SDP→1958–1962
 Vilho Turunen 1958–1962
 Heikki Törmä SDP→1959–1962
 Olli J. Uoti 1959–1962, 1966–1967

Election results

See also 
 List of Social Democratic Party (Finland) breakaway parties

References

Political parties established in 1959
Political parties disestablished in 1973
Defunct political parties in Finland
Social democratic parties
1959 establishments in Finland
1973 disestablishments in Finland
Political schisms